Maverick Capital is a long/short equity hedge fund in Dallas, TX founded in 1993 by Lee Ainslie. In 1993, Lee Ainslie (who was just 28 at the time, and a Tiger Cub, or a protege under Julian Robertson at Tiger Management.) helped raise $38 million in capital by the family of Texas entrepreneur Sam Wyly. From 1995 to 2014, the fund returned a compounded return of 13% annually. As of February 2019, Maverick has $14.9 billion in assets under management and 129 employees.

It primarily sticks with stocks (avoiding bonds, commodities, currencies, and options), holding both long and short positions and buying what it thinks will beat the market. It employs fundamental analysis and examines management closely. It examines companies for "good capital-allocation decisions", and especially how incremental returns on invested capital compare to the cost of capital. In 2006, Lee Ainslie mentioned "It’s quite frustrating as a shareholder that companies are not using cash more productively for their shareholders, whether by buying back stock or by issuing dividends". Lee Ainslie describes Maverick Capital as a traditional fund that puts greater premium on the value of its relationships with management teams than more "interventionist" hedge funds.

It started to diversify into young companies in 2004 under its flagship equities hedge fund (under David Singer). In October 2014, Maverick announced that it would be hitting the startup scene by launching its first venture capital fund on January 1, 2015. Many of its investments involve healthcare and biotechnology.

By the end of 2015, it carried over $6.9 billion in holdings.

References

Tiger Management
Hedge funds